The Salton Sea is a shallow, landlocked, highly saline body of water in Riverside and Imperial counties at the southern end of the U.S. state of California. It lies on the San Andreas Fault within the Salton Trough, which stretches to the Gulf of California in Mexico.

Over millions of years, the Colorado River had flowed into the Imperial Valley and deposited alluvium (soil), creating fertile farmland, building up the terrain, and constantly moving its main course and river delta. For thousands of years, the river alternately flowed into the valley, or diverted around it, creating either a salt lake called Lake Cahuilla, or a dry desert basin, respectively. When the Colorado River flowed into the valley, the lake level depended on river flows and the balance between inflow and evaporative loss. When the river diverted around the valley, the lake dried completely, as it did around 1580. Hundreds of archaeological sites have been found in this region, indicating possibly long-term Native American villages and temporary camps.

The current lake was formed from an inflow of water from the Colorado River in 1905. Beginning in 1900, an irrigation canal was dug from the Colorado River to the old Alamo River channel to provide water to the Imperial Valley for farming. The headgates and canals sustained a buildup of silt, so a series of cuts were made in the bank of the Colorado River to further increase the water flow. Water from spring floods broke through a canal head-gate diverting a portion of the river flow into the Salton Basin for two years before repairs were completed. A 2023 report puts surface area at 318 square miles.

During the early 20th century the lake would have dried up, except that farmers used generous amounts of Colorado River water for irrigation and let the excess flow into the lake. In the 1950s and into the 1960s, the area became a resort destination, and communities grew with hotels and vacation homes. Birdwatching was also popular as the wetlands were a major resting stop on the Pacific Flyway. In the 1970s, scientists issued warnings that the lake would continue to shrink and become more inhospitable to wildlife. In the 1980s, contamination from farm runoff promoted the outbreak and spread of wildlife diseases. Massive die-offs of the avian populations have occurred, especially after the loss of several species of fish on which they depend. Salinity rose so high that large fish kills occurred, often blighting the beaches of the sea with their carcasses. Tourism was drastically reduced.

After 1999, the lake began to shrink as local agriculture used the water more efficiently, so less runoff flowed into the lake. As the lake bed became exposed, the winds sent clouds of toxic dust into nearby communities. Smaller amounts of dust reached into the Los Angeles area and people there could sometimes smell an odor coming from the lake. The state is mainly responsible for fixing the problems. California lawmakers pledged to fund air-quality management projects in conjunction with the signing of the 2003 agreement to send more water to coastal cities. Local, state and federal bodies all had found minimal success dealing with the dust, dying wildlife, and other problems for which warnings had been issued decades before. At the beginning of 2018, local agencies declared an emergency and, along with the state, funded and developed the Salton Sea Management Program. 

In 2020, Palm Springs Life magazine summarized the ecological situation as "Salton Sea derives its fame as the biggest environmental disaster in California history".

History

Before the modern era
The Gulf of California would extend as far north as the city of Indio, were it not for the delta created by the Colorado River. Over three million years, through all of the Pleistocene, the river's delta expanded until it cut off the northern part of the gulf. Since then, the Colorado River has alternated between emptying into the basin, creating a freshwater lake, and emptying into the gulf, leaving the lake to dry and turn to desert. Wave-cut shorelines at various elevations record a repeated cycle of filling and drying over hundreds of thousands of years. The most recent freshwater lake was Lake Cahuilla, also known as the Blake Sea after American professor and geologist William Phipps Blake.

Archaeological sites and radiocarbon dates indicate that the lake was filled three or four times over the last 1300 years. When full, the lake would attract Native Americans to its shores. Hundreds of sites have been found, some possibly long-term villages and other temporary camps. The occupants ate at least four species of fish (two of which were razorback sucker and bonytail chub), birds (particularly the coot), black-tailed jackrabbit, black-tailed cottontail rabbit, and sometimes deer and bighorn sheep. Among the plants they used were bulrush, cattail, mesquite, and saltbush. The Cahuilla people have an oral memory of the last lake, which existed in the 17th century and dried up soon after 1700.

Throughout the Spanish period of California's history, the area was referred to as the "Colorado Desert" after the Colorado River. In a railroad survey completed in 1855, it was called "the Valley of the Ancient Lake". On several old maps from the Library of Congress, it has been found labeled "Cahuilla Valley" (after the local Native American tribe) and "Cabazon Valley" (after a local Native American chief – Chief Cabazon). "Salt Creek" first appeared on a map in 1867 and "Salton Station" is on a railroad map from 1900, although this place had existed as a rail stop since the late 1870s. Until the advent of the modern sea, the Salton Sink was the site of a major salt-mining operation.

Modern formation

In 1900, under governor James Budd, the California Development Company began construction of irrigation canals to divert water from the Colorado River into the Salton Sink, a dry lake bed. After construction of these irrigation canals, the Salton Sink became fertile for a time, allowing farmers to plant crops.

Within two years, the Alamo Canal became filled with silt from the Colorado River. Engineers tried to alleviate the blockages to no avail. In 1905, heavy rainfall and snowmelt caused the Colorado River to swell, overrunning the third intake cut into the bank of the river and sending the flood into the Alamo Canal. Over about two years, these two newly created rivers carried the entire volume of the Colorado River into the Salton Sink.

The Southern Pacific Railroad tried to stop the flooding by dumping earth into the canal's headgates area, but the effort was not fast enough, and the river eroded deeper and deeper into the dry desert sand of the Imperial Valley. A large waterfall formed as a result and began cutting rapidly upstream along the path of the Alamo Canal that now was occupied by the Colorado.

As the basin filled, the town of Salton, a Southern Pacific Railroad siding, the New Liverpool Salt Company facility and miniature railroad, and Torres-Martinez Native American land were submerged. The tribe's reservation now straddles the northern end of the lake. The sudden influx of water and the lack of any drainage from the basin resulted in the formation of the Salton Sea.

Agriculture, tourism and wildlife proliferate
In the 1920s, agriculture had boomed in the valley as the Imperial Irrigation District delivered large quantities of Colorado River water to irrigate the crops. The lake would have dried up naturally, but with flood irrigation being commonly used, plenty of water ran off the farms into the lake and kept it full. The district holds senior rights to water from the Colorado River according to Doctrine of Prior Appropriation, which is based on whoever first put the water to beneficial use could continue to claim it. In 1930, a wildlife refuge was established on some wetlands along the edge of the lake that had attracted many birds. The fish flourished in the lake and provided a source of food for massive populations of migratory birds. Birdwatchers flocked to this new refuge in the middle of a desert.

The continuing intermittent flooding of the Imperial Valley from the Colorado River ended with the construction of Hoover Dam. Imperial Dam, built in 1938, serves as a desilting dam for water entering the irrigation canals.

In the 1950s and into the 1960s, the communities expanded as the area's reputation as a resort destination and sport fishery grew. Hotels and yacht clubs were built on the shore along with homes and schools. Resorts in communities like Bombay Beach hosted entertainers such as Frank Sinatra, The Beach Boys and Bing Crosby. Yacht clubs held parties at night and golf courses provided recreation. Many people came for boating activities such as water skiing and fishing as stocked fish proliferated. Lakeshore communities grew as vacation homes were built. More than 1.5 million visitors visited annually at the peak.

Catastrophic decline
In the 1970s, scientists issued warnings about the changes coming to this lake with no outlet. Studies that started in the 1960s found a complex problem for which any remediation would be expensive. Water from the Colorado River is diverted near Yuma, Arizona, into the  All-American Canal. The canal runs west along the Mexican border and then north into  of irrigation channels that crisscross the farms.

Gravity carries the agricultural runoff downhill through the New and Alamo rivers to the lake. The water is full of salts, selenium, and fertilizers (mainly nitrates). As it drains through the soil, the water leaches out ancient salt deposits that also raise the salinity. Evaporation in the desert heat further concentrates the salt. The transformation of the lake made it increasingly inhospitable to wildlife. Before the end of the decade, fish started dying off and bird populations declined.

In the late 1970s, a series of heavy tropical storms caused the water level to rapidly rise and flood its banks. The surrounding towns and businesses were severely damaged, many beyond repair. In 1976, Hurricane Kathleen inundated the lakeshore communities and put Bombay Beach completely underwater. Tourism was drastically reduced, and many of the resorts and associated infrastructure were abandoned. The state began to issue odor advisories as the lake began to stink.

In the 1990s, the shores were littered with dead fish as the lake had gotten so salty that large die-offs occurred. Fertilizers in the runoff caused massive blooms of algae. When storms churned the lake, botulism spread among the dying tilapia, which were eaten by the birds. During a four-month long period in 1996, 14,000 birds died from eating the fish, nearly 10,000 of which were pelicans. The carcasses were burned in an incinerator 24 hours a day for weeks. The resulting news coverage conveyed a simplified story that implied the lake was a toxic catastrophe filled with water that could be deadly. As a congressman in 1995, former mayor of nearby Palm Springs, Sonny Bono, advocated for attention to the problems. His wife and some politicians took up the cause as a form of tribute to Bono after his death in a 1998 skiing accident. Congress passed and President Bill Clinton signed into law the Salton Sea Reclamation Act of 1998 (Public Law 105-372). In 1999, the lake began to recede dramatically. The dropping water level stranded many of the remaining boat docks, residences, and businesses. Water-management priorities were changing including diverting water from agricultural areas to cities. The U.S. Department of the Interior prepared a draft Environmental Impact Report in compliance with the Reclamation Act and working in partnership with the Salton Sea Authority. A Strategic Science Plan and the Bureau of Reclamation's Alternatives Appraisal Report were also added to the voluminous studies of the lake. Before the legislative and scientific recommendations were implemented, priorities shifted away from activities at the lake after the September 11 attacks in 2001.

In 2003, the Imperial Irrigation District signed the largest agriculture-to-urban water transfer agreement in US history. Much of its water allocation would go to communities along the California coast at a profit. With a 45-year term, the Quantification Settlement Agreement was a means for the San Diego County Water Authority and other districts to obtain additional water for the growing communities they serve. Local agriculture became more efficient at using water which resulted in the shoreline retreating as less run-off flowed into the lake. Farmers installed sprinklers to replace flood irrigation and used soil measurement devices that tell them when to water. As the Salton Sea shrank, it became saltier than ocean water. The California State Legislature, by legislation enacted in 2003 and 2004, directed the secretary of the California Resources Agency to prepare a restoration plan for the Salton Sea ecosystem, and an Environmental Impact Report. The Salton Sea Authority had a consultant study the alternatives and in 2004 issued their preferred alternative. After receiving comments from other agencies, they approved a new report in 2006. They hoped the reports would influence the state as it prepared the proposal mandated by the legislature.

The state released an $8.9-billion proposal in 2007 that involved building a horseshoe-shaped outer lake, a berm crossing the center of the lake and an extensive system of dikes, channels and pumps. Due to their concerns about the impact on the lake, the district only approved the water transfer agreement after Governor Gray Davis had signed the 2003 legislation known as the Salton Sea Restoration Act. It stated that it was the "intent of the Legislature that the State of California undertake the restoration of the Salton Sea ecosystem and the permanent protection of the wildlife dependent on that ecosystem". The restoration plan was not implemented as state lawmakers found it too expensive and the Great Recession hit the economy. Repeated delays and dwindling public interest precluded any real change.

Exposed lakebed impacts air quality
The lake continued to dry up, exposing more lake bed known as playa, and sending nearby communities clouds of toxic dust. A haze incorporating pesticide plumes, exhaust fumes, factory emissions, and the vaporized dust from the lake regularly hangs over the communities in the valley. With a dense blend of ozone and particulate matter, Imperial County became known for some of the worst air quality in the country. Eastern Coachella communities have disproportionately higher rates of asthma and respiratory complications because of high concentrations of contaminants in the air. Over 20% of the children in the region have asthma (with the national rate being less than 10%). Scientists are studying how much of this is due to the Salton Sea dust and what is actually in the windblown particles. Ten schools in the Imperial Valley use green, yellow, and red flags signaling air quality for the many children who have asthma. Green means they join their friends on the playground, whereas red means they stay inside all day. Parents can also receive emailed alerts from the Imperial County Air Pollution Control District. Local activists ask if this is an issue of environmental justice, since the area most impacted is 85% Latinos. Some 650,000 people, many who are farmworkers, live where there are significant exposure to the dust. The public health impacts of continuing not to meet federal air quality standards include the treatment of child and adult asthma, cardiac disease, lung cancer, and increased mortality rates. Lower concentrations of the wind-borne dust travels all the way into Southern California and Arizona.

During the first 15 years after the sale of the Imperial water to San Diego County, the Imperial Irrigation District has been required to put water into the Salton Sea to compensate for the loss of agricultural runoff needed to replenish the sea. As the 2017 deadline for ending the additional mitigation water approached, the district, along with Imperial County, petitioned the California State Water Resources Control Board in 2014 with a demand for state action to fulfill its obligation after years of delays and unfulfilled plans. Pacific Institute, an environmental think tank, was warning that the lack of replenishment water was leading to a "period of very rapid deterioration." The rapidly shrinking sea was a "looming environmental and public health crisis". With the increased shrinkage, dust storms would increase and the rotten-egg smell would reach the coastal cities more frequently.

About , or about 10%, of Imperial Valley's arable farmland was temporarily fallowed to meet the reductions in the water transfer agreement. The farms in the Imperial Valley produce alfalfa, wheat, and vegetables such as carrots and Brussels sprouts. , the most widely planted crop was alfalfa, followed by bermuda grass and sudan grass. A third of the hay produced here was exported to China, the United Arab Emirates, Saudi Arabia, and Japan. Most of exported hay feeds dairy cows, while Japan uses it for Kobe beef.

On January 1, 2018, 40% less water began flowing into the sea as the 15-year mitigation period ended per the 2003 water transfer agreement. A court decision also forced the Imperial Irrigation District to end a program that had allowed it to equally distribute and cap the amount of water its members receive. Although it had been shrinking for years, this began to lower the water level significantly. As the shore recedes, at least  of playa will be exposed by 2045, with additional dust becoming wind blown as the exposed playa dries out. A vertical drop of one foot in the water level can expose thousands of feet of horizontal playa. The state is mainly responsible, as California lawmakers pledged to fund air-quality management projects to mitigate impacts from the 2003 water transfer agreement. Over the years, local, state and federal bodies have found minimal success dealing with the dust from the exposed playa. To reduce wind-borne dust, the district has a program known as vegetation enhancement and surface roughening, which includes plowing furrows on newly exposed playa within property owned by the district.

Fugitive dust, consisting of very small particles suspended in air, is being studied to distinguish between playa dust and desert emissions that are primarily made up of mineral dust from soil. The Imperial County Air Quality Management District, the South Coast Air Quality Management District, and the University of California at Riverside School of Medicine along with the environmental justice group Comite Civico Del Valle are using mobile and stationary air quality monitoring units in the effort to protect the health of the nearby residents.

The Salton Sea Management Program
The Salton Sea Task Force was formed by the state in 2015 by Governor Jerry Brown's administration. The Natural Resources Agency released the Salton Sea Management Program (SSMP) in March 2017. The SSMP proposes constructing  of habitat restoration and dust suppression projects on lakebed areas that have been, or will be, exposed at the Salton Sea by the year 2028. This will improve conditions for residents and wildlife. The initial 10-year plan will cover less than half of the dry lakebed that researchers say will be exposed during that time. The state initially budgeted $80.5 million to begin designing the wetlands without a commitment that the program will ever be fully funded. The projected cost to design and construct the improvements is $383 million. The focus was no longer on restoring the lake but presenting a feasible plan with a budget that legislators would gradually fund over the ten-year period. The 10-year plan won't fix everything so state and local officials continue to seek ways to deal with the problems. Salton Sea Management Program Monitoring and Adaptive Management Implementation Plan is being developed that will prioritize and phase-in implementation of the 2013 USGS Salton Sea Ecosystem Monitoring and Assessment Plan.

The first state-funded project was the Torres-Martinez Wetland Project. The Torres Martinez Desert Cahuilla Indians partnered with the state to restore shallow wetlands along the northern edge of the sea that was destroyed by a massive storm in 2012. This prototype project was completed in April 2018.

In November 2019, an emergency was declared because of the "heavily polluted New River, which empties into the Salton Sea". The Imperial County Board of Supervisors were hoping that this would accelerate the restoration projects by enabling the state to obtain federal funding. Nearly all the state's funding comes from bond measures for the Salton Sea projects. Since 2000, California voters have approved five bond measures .

In February 2020, the California Natural Resources Agency finished the "Bruchard Road Dust Suppression Project" which, although only , was the first dust suppression project to be completed under the Salton Sea Management Program: Phase 1: 10 Year Plan (August 2018). Construction began on the ambitious  Species Conservation Habitat Project in January 2021 on the small delta of the New River. The project is building ponds and wetlands on both sides of the mouth of this highly polluted river on the southern bank of the sea. Water from the Salton Sea will be combined with the river water to control salinity and naturally occurring selenium. federal government said in November 2022,  it will spend $250 million over four years for the project.

Water importation review 

Many concepts have been proposed on how to deal with the problems. The idea of importing seawater from the Pacific Ocean or the Sea of Cortez in Mexico has been around for a long time. The area's plentiful geothermal power could be used to desalinate the water. Around 2004, Aqua Genesis Ltd proposed such a project that would sell the nonsaline water.

In 2018, the California Natural Resources Agency requested proposals to increase waterflow to the sea to reduce dust and dust-borne toxins. The 11 proposals ranged in cost from $300 million to several billion dollars.

A June 9, 2020, research report stated that the cost of "transferring water from agricultural users to the Salton Sea" would be lower and achievable using existing infrastructure. The aqueduct proposal, and others, hung on the outcome of a feasibility study. The state-appointed panel of experts rejected the idea in 2022 after a yearlong review.

Ecology

Salinity

The water of the Salton Sea has a salinity of 44 grams of salt per liter, greater than that of the Pacific Ocean (35 g/L). The lack of an outflow means the Salton Sea does not have a natural stabilization system; it is very dynamic. Fluctuations in the water level caused by variations in agricultural runoff, the ancient salt deposits in the lake bed, and the relatively high salinity of the inflow feeding the sea are all causing increasing salinity. The concentration has been increasing at a rate of about 3% per year. About 3.6 million tonnes of salt are deposited in the valley each year. An undated report on the University of California: Imperial County website provided these specifics: "Salton Sea salinity is about 44,000 mg/L, that is about 4.4% salt. The amount of salts that is deposited in the Imperial Valley agricultural land with irrigation water is about 4 million tons of salts annually. To maintain crop productivities, equal amount of salts must be leached from the root zone".

Fertilizer runoffs have resulted in eutrophication, with large algal blooms and elevated bacterial levels. By the 1970s, the runoff which was full of salty chemicals led to a warning that the salinity of the lake would no longer sustain wildlife. By January 2020, the salinity of the Salton Sea was double that of the Atlantic Ocean. Both the hypersalinity and presence of contaminants in the Salton Sea triggered massive die-offs in the fish and avian populations; salt water carries less oxygen than fresh water, which was further depleted by algal blooms and by extreme temperatures during the summer period.

Fish population

The desert pupfish is the only native fish species in the sea, and is a federally listed endangered species in the United States. This freshwater fish, notable for its ability to withstand the rising salinity of the Salton Sea, can survive salinities ranging from freshwater to twice as salty as seawater.

The body was initially a freshwater lake and was stocked with tilapia, gulf croaker, orangemouth corvina, and sargo, which sustained an important sport fishery and provided food for birds. By the 1960s, its rising salinity had begun to jeopardize some of these species. A September 2019 report stated that 20 years earlier, "there were some 100 million fish in the Sea. Now, more than 97% of those fish are gone". It is now too saline for most species of fish. Massive fish kills involve the oxygen-depleting combination of summer sun and salt. The fish suffocate as salt water carries less oxygen than fresh water. The dead fish wash up in mass quantities on the beaches.

Introduced tilapia (hybrid Mozambique × Wami) can tolerate the high salinity levels and pollution. As of 2014, other fresh and brackish water fish species lived in the rivers and canals that fed the Salton Sea, including redbelly tilapia, threadfin shad, carp, red shiner, channel catfish, white catfish, largemouth bass, mosquitofish, and sailfin molly.

Tilapia populations have reached such low volumes such that the fish-eating birds in the area cannot be sustained anymore. Scientists have approximated that if the sea's salinity reaches levels of 70 ppt (more likely to occur than not due to the end of mitigation flows at the start of 2018), there won't be any species of fish left that will be able to survive in the sea's main body. As the decline of Tilapia populations in the Salton Sea continues, there has been an immense proliferation of the water boatman population which do serve as feed for "a limited number of aquatic and shorebird species". A direct concern of the potential eradication of fish species from the sea include mosquito production, which is usually abundant in high salinity salt marshes but have been low due to the presence of fish. There have been worries about this potential outcome as mosquitoes in warm regions have been known to "act as vectors of West Nile virus, Western equine encephalitis and St. Louis encephalitis".

The California Office of Environmental Health Hazard Assessment developed a safe eating advisory for fish caught in the Salton Sea based on levels of mercury or PCBs found in local species. As of 2009, all species were considered acceptable for all populations.

Avian population
The Salton Sea has been termed a "crown jewel of avian biodiversity" by Milt Friend of the Salton Sea Science Office. It hosts "the most diverse and probably most significant populations of bird life in the continental United States, rivaled only by Big Bend, Texas;" over 400 species have been documented. The Salton Sea is also a major resting stop on the Pacific Flyway. A December 2018 report by the National Geographic Society stated: "Nearly all of California's population of eared grebes, for example, stop over at the lake, and at least a third of all the white pelicans living in North America ..." The report expressed concern about the reducing input of water into the Sea and the increasing salinity. "Without that extra water, the lake's shrinking will start to accelerate—making it saltier, smaller, less welcoming to the birds that rely on it during migration".

Both the hypersalinity and presence of contaminants in the Salton Sea triggered massive die-offs in the fish and avian populations and the contamination promoted the outbreak and spread of diseases such as avian cholera. In turn, the loss of several species of fish that the avian population depended on for food increased their risk of starvation, exacerbating their decline. Birdwatchers in 2017 reported that most of the American white pelicans, double-crested cormorants, and eared grebes have disappeared.

Vegetation

According to the A. W. Kuchler U.S. potential natural vegetation types, the area roughly within  of the sandy shoreline of the Salton Sea would have a saltbush/greasewood (40) vegetation type and a Great Basin shrubland (7) vegetation form.

Geography

This saline, endorheic rift lake on the San Andreas Fault at the southern end of the U.S. state of California lies between, and within, the Imperial and Coachella valleys, all of which lie within the larger Salton Trough, a pull-apart basin that stretches to the Gulf of California in Mexico. The deepest point of the lake is only  higher than the lowest point of Death Valley.

A 2023 report puts surface area at 318 square miles. The New, Whitewater, and Alamo rivers, combined with agricultural runoff, are the primary sources that feed the lake. The Salton Sea is the largest lake in California by surface area. However, due to changes in water apportionments agreed upon for the Colorado River under the Quantification Settlement Agreement of 2003, the surface area of the sea is expected to decrease by 60% between 2013 and 2021.

Ownership 
The land under the lake is a patchwork of ownership spread across three primary entities: the federal government – mostly the Bureau of Reclamation and the Bureau of Land Management, the Imperial Irrigation District (IID), and the Torres Martinez Desert Cahuilla Indians.

Climate
According to the Köppen climate classification system, the Salton Sea has a hot desert climate (BWh). According to the United States Department of Agriculture, the Plant Hardiness zone is 9b with an average annual extreme minimum temperature of 28.5 °F (−1.9 °C). The temperature of the surface water changes with the seasonally varying air temperature.

Geology

Earthquakes and tectonic setting

The Salton Sea and surrounding basin sits over the San Andreas Fault, San Jacinto Fault, Imperial Fault Zone, and a "stepover fault" shear zone system. Geologists have determined that previous flooding episodes from the Colorado River have been linked to earthquakes along the San Andreas Fault. Sonar and other instruments were used to map the Salton Sea's underwater faults during the study. During the period when the basin was filled by Lake Cahuilla, a much larger inland sea, earthquakes higher than magnitude 7 occurred roughly every 180 years, the last one occurring within decades of 1700. Computer models suggest the normal faults in the area are most vulnerable to deviatoric stress loading by filling in of water. Currently, a risk still exists for an earthquake of magnitude 7 to 8. Simulations also showed, in the Los Angeles area, shaking and thus damage would be more severe for a San Andreas earthquake that propagated along the fault from the south, rather than from the north. Such an earthquake also raises the risk for soil liquefaction in the Imperial Valley region.

Past sea level rise may partially be responsible for the salinity of the lake, while potential future changes in sea levels could occur.

Volcanism

Evidence of geothermal activity is visible. The Salton Buttes are volcanoes in the geothermal field of the same name. Mudpots and mud volcanoes are found on the eastern side of the Salton Sea, including the mobile Niland Geyser. The area is used for geothermal electricity generation, with plants located along the southeastern shore of the Salton Sea in Imperial County.

Lithium production
The geothermal activity below the Salton Sea loosens up lithium that can be mined. Due to increased demand for lithium, which is crucial for electric-vehicle battery production, the Salton Sea area is attracting attention, and the extraction of lithium is expected to boost the local economy. The brine contains lithium, calcium, sodium and other minerals that are very complex to separate. The California Energy Commission estimates the sea might produce 600k metric tons of lithium carbonate per year.

In July 2021, General Motors announced that it was partnering with Controlled Thermal Resources to develop a combined lithium extraction and power generation facility in the Hell's Kitchen geothermal field in the Salton Sea, employing a closed-loop process. Brine will be extracted from the ground, with geothermal steam being used to drive a turbine generating electricity, and reacting with the brine to separate the lithium hydroxide and lithium carbonate used for battery production.

Berkshire Hathaway Energy has a subsidiary that operates 10 geothermal plants in the area. Berkshire's BHE Renewables division plans to open a lithium carbonate pilot plant in the spring of 2023.

Communities

The U.S. Navy conducted a preliminary inspection of the Salton Sea in January 1940, and the Salton Sea Test Base (SSTB, run by Sandia Labs) was initially commissioned as the Naval Auxiliary Air Station Salton Sea, in October 1942. The SSTB, just to the southeast of Salton City, originally functioned as an operational and training base for seaplanes. Additional activities at the base included experimental testing of solid-fuel plane-launched rockets, jet-assist take-off testing, aeroballistic testing of inert atomic weapon test units at land and marine target areas, training bombing at marine targets, testing of the effects of long-term storage on atomic weapons, testing of the Project Mercury space capsule parachute landing systems, parachute training and testing, and military training exercises. The base was abandoned in 1978.

The Salton Sea had some success as a resort area, with Salton City, Salton Sea Beach, and Desert Shores, on the western shore and Desert Beach, North Shore, and Bombay Beach, built on the eastern shore in the 1950s. Due to the increasing salinity and pollution of the lake over the years from agricultural runoff and other sources, the communities substantially shrank in size, or have been abandoned. The smell of the lake, combined with the stench of the decaying fish, also contributed to the decline of the tourist industry around the Salton Sea. The US Geological Survey describes the smell as "objectionable", "noxious", "unique", and "pervasive".

Arts and culture
A 2020 article provided this comment about the settlements around the Salton Sea: Since 2011, Bombay Beach and its surrounds have been reinvented as a destination for desert art.  It's not alone in that distinction – south of the city lie the towns of Niland and Slab City, other areas that have attracted artists and led to creations like East Jesus and Salvation Mountain.

Some people are visiting the Salton Sea and the surrounding settlements to explore the abandoned structures and see the squatter settlement of Slab City. In late June 2020, a fire in Niland caused a great deal of damage, displacing 112 people; by that time, the estimated population had diminished to 500.

The population of Bombay Beach declined for years and the buildings were rotting away, but some people had moved into the settlement. A news item in April 2018 stated that it was "enjoying a rebirth of sorts with an influx of artists, intellectuals and hipsters who have turned it into a bohemian playground".

Recreation
The Salton Sea State Recreation Area offers hunting, fishing, swimming, and camping to visitors on the northeastern side of the sea.

Powerboat racing
"Low barometric pressure and greater water density make the Salton Sea the fastest body of water in the world for speedboat racing," according to an article in the January–February 1950 issue of National Motorist magazine. (This statement, however, erroneously conflates low barometric pressure with low altitude, when in fact the opposite is true, and the extremely low altitude of the region provides higher barometric pressure, beneficial for internal combustion engines) "The low altitude was thought to be ideal for carburetion and there was talk that this was the 'fastest body of water in the world.'" Beginning in the late 1920s, these properties have made the Salton Sea attractive as a venue for such races.

Although these natural advantages were at first attacked as unfair by other courses, by the mid 1930s the Salton Sea racing organization was backed by the National Power Boat Association and attracting some of the best boats and drivers in the US. Races were held at Desert Beach annually between 1941 and 1951 and subsequently at other beaches, ultimately on the west side of the Sea.

From 1961 through 1965, the Sea hosted the Salton City 500, a marathon endurance race which attracted drivers as notable as Mickey Thompson and astronaut Gordon Cooper.

After a lengthy hiatus, in 2008 racing returned when new world records were set by a sprint boat at the Salton Sea Speed Week.

In popular culture

Films
 The Salton Sea (2002), by Tony Gayton, directed by D.J. Caruso and starring Val Kilmer, Vincent D'Onofrio and Peter Sarsgaard.
 Plagues and Pleasures on the Salton Sea (2006), by filmmakers Chris Metzler and Jeff Springer is narrated by John Waters. Melding high camp with stark realism the film covers the first 100 years of the history of the Salton Sea featuring rare archival photos and footage, plus interviews with the residents who call the Salton Sea home.
 A visit to the Salton Sea inspired filmmaker Curtis Harrington to make his dreamlike short film On the Edge (1949), which extensively uses the bubbling mudpots on the edge of the sea. In a 1971 interview, Harrington stated, "The location I used is entirely covered by water now; the sea has risen to cover it."
 The film, The Monster That Challenged the World (1957), deals with gigantic prehistoric mollusks that are reawakened after residing, in suspended animation, at the bottom of the Salton Sea. 
 Bombay Beach is a 2011 documentary film directed and produced by Israeli filmmaker Alma Har'el. Using the failed 1950s development boom in Bombay Beach, the film is a dreamlike poem with three personal stories.
 The short documentary, The Useless Sea (2016), is a film focusing on the environmental challenges and the beauty surrounding the Salton Sea.
 Miracle in the Desert: The Rise and Fall of the Salton Sea (2020) is a documentary that tells the full origin of the creation of the sea, as well as the real estate boom and bust from 1950 to 1970 while examining the exodus of people from the sea and the current environmental crisis it faces.

Television
 The History Channel's 2006 episode "Engineering Disasters 18" (#13-04), from the television documentary series Modern Marvels, describes the combined manmade and natural events leading to the creation of the Salton Sea in the early 20th century, its brief popularity as a resort destination midcentury, and its subsequent decline due to high salinity and farm runoff. Impacts to Salton Sea fish and bird populations are addressed and future plans to rescue the sea are described.
 National Geographic Explorer was present on June 10, 2018, to record an encounter between supporters of a flat Earth and members of the Independent Investigations Group. An experiment successfully demonstrated the curvature of the earth via the disappearance over distance of boat-based and shore-based targets.

Music
 The video for Michael Jackson's "In the Closet" (1992) was filmed at the Salton Sea. Clips of Jackson dancing on the set of that video were used in the video for his song "A Place with No Name" (2014).
 The video for Kesha's "Praying" (2017) was partly filmed at the Salton Sea.
Mitski's song "Drunk Walk Home" (2014) opens with the couplet "I will retire to the Salton Sea / at the age of 23." This is a reference to the end-of-the-road perception of the Salton Sea.
Sheverb recorded the album "Once Upon A Time In Bombay Beach" in the nearly abandoned town of Bombay Beach in early 2020.
The album cover art for Weyes Blood's "Front Row Seat to Earth" (2016) was photographed beside the Salton Sea. The sea served as inspiration for the beginning of the album process. Mering described it as "a completely desolate wasteland, full of mass extinction, brought on by humankind." Salton Sea appears in music videos of two of the album's singles, "Generation Why" and "Used To Be".

Video games
 In the video game Grand Theft Auto V (2013), a large lake called the Alamo Sea is based on the Salton Sea; Sandy Shores, a town that sits on the lake's southern edge, is based on the town of Bombay Beach.

Literature
 In Blue Labyrinth, by Douglas Preston & Lincoln Child, the abandoned resort areas of the Salton Sea serve as one setting visited and investigated by FBI Special Agent Aloysius Pendergast.
 In Robert A. Heinlein’s short story "Water is for Washing", the Salton Sea is the site of a catastrophic flood when an earthquake shatters the range of alluvial deposits separating the Imperial Valley from the Gulf of California, precipitating a tsunami moving north to transiently drown these lowlands.
 In Based on a True Story: A Memoir by Norm Macdonald, Norm visits the Fat Man with the Artificial Hair, who lives in a mansion in the Salton Sea resort. While making a deal for a million dollar loan the Fat Man with the Artificial Hair eats a fresh caught Tilapia, a fish which can survive the high salinity of the sea.

Legends
In the legend of the lost pearl ship of Juan de Iturbe, the Spanish explorer abandons a ship full of gems in Lake Cahuilla.

See also

 List of drying lakes
 List of lakes in California

References

Notes

Bibliography

Further reading
 deBuys, William and Myers, Joan (1999), "Salt Dreams: Land and Water in Low-down California", University of New Mexico Press, Albuquerque, 

 
 Setmire, James G., et al. (1993). Detailed study of water quality, bottom sediment, and biota associated with irrigation drainage in the Salton Sea area, California, 1988–90 [Water-Resources Investigations Report 93-4014]. Sacramento, Calif.: U.S. Department of the Interior, U.S. Geological Survey.
 Setmire, James G., Wolfe, John C., and Stroud, Richard K. (1990). Reconnaissance investigation of water quality, bottom sediment, and biota associated with irrigation drainage in the Salton Sea area, California, 1986–87 [Water-Resources Investigations Report 89-4102]. Sacramento, Calif.: U.S. Department of the Interior, U.S. Geological Survey.
 
 Stevens, Joseph E. Hoover Dam. University of Oklahoma Press, 1988. details on the Salton Sea
 Stringfellow, Kim Greetings from the Salton Sea: Folly and Intervention in the Southern California Landscape, 1905–2005. Columbia College Chicago Press, 2005. 
 Trover, Ellen Lloyd (2018). "The Imperial Valley and the Salton Sink". Birth of the Inland Sea: How the Colorado River Created the Salton Sea. Lloyd Trover Partnership. 
 Watkins, John R. "A Common Crystal"  Strand Magazine, vol. 98 (London 1899); Holder, Charles F.  "A Remarkable Salt Deposit" National Geographic Magazine, vol. XII, no.11 (Washington, 1901)

External links

 , California Natural Resources Agency
 Salton Sea Management Efforts, California Department of Fish and Wildlife
 Salton Sea Unit: California Department of Water Resources, supports the Salton Sea Management Program (SSMP)
 The Salton Sea Authority, a joint powers agreement: counties of Riverside and Imperial, Coachella Valley Water District and Imperial Irrigation District
 Salton Sea Community Outreach, Education & Engagement Program, partnership between Comite Civico del Valle, Inc. (CCV) & the California Department of Water Resources (DWR)
 Salton Sea Management Program (SSMP), US Army Corps of Engineers, Los Angeles District
 Salton Sea, U.S. Bureau of Reclamation
 Salton Sea Photo Gallery, U.S. Bureau of Reclamation

 Salton Basin overview, College of Sciences, San Diego State University
 Salton Sea Ecosystem Monitoring and Assessment Plan, Open-File Report 2013–1133, United States Geological Survey
 Salton Sea Project KESQ
 National Geographic photos of the Salton Sea
  2011 (7 mins)
 . KQED, 2014 (61 mins)

 
Coachella Valley
Disasters in California
Endorheic lakes of California
Engineering failures
Environment of California
Environmental disasters in the United States
Geography of the Colorado Desert
Imperial Valley
Important Bird Areas of California
Lakes of California
Lakes of Imperial County, California
Lakes of Riverside County, California
Lakes of Southern California
Lakes of the Great Basin
Natural history of Imperial County, California
Saline lakes of the United States
Salton Trough
Shrunken lakes
Tourist attractions in Imperial County, California
Watersheds of California
Eutrophication